The Treasure is a 2015 Romanian film directed by Corneliu Porumboiu, starring Toma Cuzin, Adrian Purcărescu and Corneliu Cozmei. It tells the story of two young men who search for lost treasure. It was screened in the Un Certain Regard section at the 2015 Cannes Film Festival where it won the Prix Un Certain Talent prize.

Cast
 Toma Cuzin as Costi
  Adrian Purcărescu as Adrian 
 Corneliu Cozmei as Cornel
 Radu Banzaru as Vanzator
 Florin Kevorkian as Sef Costi
 Iulia Ciochina as Vanzatoare
 Cristina Toma as Raluca
 Dan Chiriac as Lica
 Laurentiu Lazar as Petrescu
 Clemence Valleteau as Emma Dumont

Production
The film was produced through the director's company 42 km Film in collaboration with France's Les Films du Worso and Rouge International. It received grants corresponding to 350,000 euro from the Romanian National Film Center and support from Arte France Cinéma, HBO and Eurimages. With the exception of Toma Cuzin, the entire cast consists of non-professional actors. Filming took place from 15 October to 15 November 2014 in Teleorman County and Bucharest.

References

External links

2015 films
Films directed by Corneliu Porumboiu
Films shot in Bucharest
Films shot in Romania
Romanian comedy films
2010s Romanian-language films